Oaxacania is a genus of flowering plants in the family Asteraceae.

Species
There is only one known species, Oaxacania malvifolia, native to the State of Oaxaca in southern Mexico.

References

Eupatorieae
Monotypic Asteraceae genera
Flora of Oaxaca